Janmabhoomi may refer to:

 Janmabhumi, an Indian Malayalam-language daily newspaper
 Janmabhoomi (Gujarati newspaper), an Indian Gujarati-language newspaper
 Janmabhoomi (1936 film), a Hindi film
 Janmabhoomi (1969 film), a Malayalam film